"Follow Your Daughter Home" is a song written by Burton Cummings, Donnie McDougall, Garry Peterson, Bill Wallace, and Kurt Winter and performed by The Guess Who.  It reached #20 in Canada and #61 on the Billboard Hot 100 in 1973.  The song was also released in the United Kingdom as a single, but it did not chart.  The song was featured on their 1973 album, Artificial Paradise. The song has a calypso-influenced melody.

Lyrically, the song tells listeners to keep tabs on their daughters and to "keep her out of mischief".  Controversially, the song asks "is she still a virgin" and -- in addition to advising the listener to follow her home and "ask a lot of questions 'bout the boy she's sleeping with" -- gives advice to "tie her up".

The song was produced by Jack Richardson.

References

1972 songs
1972 singles
Songs written by Burton Cummings
Songs written by Kurt Winter
The Guess Who songs
Song recordings produced by Jack Richardson (record producer)
RCA Victor singles